Lawrence William Thacker (19 or 20 March 1909 – 2 March 1952) was an English professional rugby league footballer who played in the 1930s and 1940s.

Background
Laurie Thacker was born in Sculcoates, East Riding of Yorkshire, England and he died aged 42 in Driffield, East Riding of Yorkshire, England.

Playing career

International honours
Thacker represented British Empire while at Hull in 1937 against France, and won caps for England while at Hull in 1938 against France, and Wales, in 1939 against France, and in 1941 against Wales.

County Cup Final appearances
Thacker played left-, i.e. number 8, in Hull FC's 10-18 defeat by Huddersfield in the 1938 Yorkshire County Cup Final during the 1938–39 season at Odsal Stadium, Bradford on Saturday 22 October 1938.

Other notable matches
Thacker played left-, i.e. number 8 for a Rugby League XIII against Northern Command XIII at Thrum Hall, Halifax on Saturday 21 March 1942.

Genealogical information
Lawrence Thacker's marriage to Gladys (née Baines) was registered during second ¼ 1947 in Hull district. They had children; Diane L. Thacker (birth registered during fourth ¼  in Hull district), Roger W. Thacker (birth registered during fourth ¼  in Hull district), and Andrea Thacker (birth registered during second ¼  in Hull district).

References

External links
 (archived by web.archive.org) Past Players → T at hullfc.com
 (archived by web.archive.org) Statistics at hullfc.com

1909 births
1952 deaths
British Empire rugby league team players
England national rugby league team players
English rugby league players
Hull F.C. players
People from Sculcoates
Rugby league props
Rugby League XIII players
Rugby league players from Kingston upon Hull
Yorkshire rugby league team players